The 1998 Vermont gubernatorial election took place on November 3, 1998. Incumbent Democrat Howard Dean ran successfully for re-election to a fourth full term as Governor of Vermont, defeating Republican candidate Ruth Dwyer.

Democratic primary

Results

Republican primary

Results

General election

Results

See also
 1998 United States Senate election in Vermont
 1998 United States House of Representatives election in Vermont

References

Vermont
Gubernatorial
1998
Howard Dean